Knee pads or kneepads are protective gear worn on knees to protect them against impact injury from falling to the ground or hitting an obstacle, or to provide padding for extended kneeling.

Use

Sports

Knee pads are worn in many recreational and sporting activities such as cycling, rollerskating, skateboarding, cricket, volleyball, handball, basketball, gridiron football, polo, dancing, etc. In polo, knee pads serve primarily to protect the rider's knee when "riding off" an opponent.

Work 
Work that requires frequent or constant kneeling, including carpet installation, plumbing, tilling, and mechanic work will normally require hard, rugged knee pads with hard shells. If work requires less or occasional kneeling, then a lighter, softer and more flexible knee pad can be used to increase comfort.

Trades and military use
Knee pads are also used in various trades such as for the home handyman, for the police SWAT teams, and they are also incorporated into military uniforms such as the Army Combat Uniform and the Marine Corps Combat Utility Uniform. These knee pads are generally designed differently than the general all round high impact knee pads made for sports.

Babies 
The padding of the baby knee pads should be soft because the baby knee is the soft part of the body. The padding foam should be soft and ultra-durable. Knee pads should be in proper fitting according to baby knees.

See also
 Elbow pad
 Gaiters
 Poleyn
 Shoulder pad (sport)

References

Rider apparel
Protective gear
Pad
Bandy equipment
Ice hockey equipment
Skateboarding equipment